"Breakin'... There's No Stopping Us" is a song by American music duo Ollie & Jerry. The song was released on June 21, 1984, as the first single from the soundtrack to the 1984 film Breakin', the song reached number nine on the US Billboard Hot 100 and number five on the UK Singles Chart. It topped the US dance charts for one week. It is the theme song to the film Breakin'. The drums were created using the Roland TR-808 and Linn LM-1 drum machines.

Music video
The music video features footage from the film Breakin, as well as numerous street break dancing performances. Jean-Claude Van Damme, who was an extra in the film, can be seen dancing in the background at one point.

Track listing and formats12" vinyl single'''
 Breakin' ... There's No Stopping Us (Club Mix) 6:51	
 Breakin' ... There's No Stopping Us (Instrumental) 5:33

Credits and personnel
Ollie E. Brown - drum machine, synthesizers, production, mixing
Jerry Knight - bass synth, production, mixing, engineering

Charts
Weekly charts

DJ Luck & MC Neat version

In 1999, the song was covered by UK garage duo DJ Luck & MC Neat featuring singer JJ, retitled as "Ain't No Stoppin' Us". It first appeared on the Red Rose EP'' (1999), then was released as an official single the following year. Their version peaked at No. 8 on the UK Singles Chart.

Charts

Ilanda version

Charts

Other versions
1998: Ice-T

References

1984 songs
1984 debut singles
2000 singles
Ollie & Jerry songs
Ilanda songs
Joanne Accom songs
Songs written by Ollie E. Brown
Songs written by Jerry Knight
Songs written for films
Polydor Records singles